Boinda railway station is a railway station on the East Coast Railway network in the state of Odisha, India. It serves Boinda town. Its code is BONA. It has two platforms. Passenger, Express and Superfast trains halt at Boinda railway station.

Major trains

 Puri–Durg Express
 Tapaswini Express
 Puri–Ahmedabad Weekly Express
 Rourkela–Gunupur Rajya Rani Express
 Puri–Sainagar Shirdi Express
 Bikaner–Puri Express
 Howrah–Sambalpur Superfast Express
 Sambalpur–Puri Intercity Express
 Rourkela–Bhubaneswar Intercity Express
 Bhubaneswar–Bolangir Intercity Superfast Express
 Hirakud Express

References

See also
 Angul district

Railway stations in Angul district
Sambalpur railway division